The 2021–22 Welsh League Cup (known for sponsorship purposes as The Nathaniel MG Cup) was the 30th season of the Welsh League cup competition, which was established in 1992.  The reigning champions were Connah's Quay Nomads.

Format 

44 clubs  in the Cymru Premier, Cymru North and Cymru South leagues will  enter the season's League Cup.
 Newport County and Denbigh Town were awarded the two wildcard spots for the current season.
In the first round, the wildcard entrants were placed one in each section, joining 13 clubs from each of the Cymru North and South
Three teams from each of the Cymru North and Cymru South were awarded byes in the first round, and along with the 12 Cymru Premier teams join the competition in the Second round.

Access List

First round
The draw for the first round took place on 24 June 2021.  The game between Port Talbot Town and Swansea University was postponed on 16 July after two Port Talbot players tested positive for COVID-19 and the Port Talbot squad was told to self-isolate by Welsh health authorities. Port Talbot Town subsequently forfeited the match in line with the approach adopted by the Football Association of Wales for the 2021–22 season's cup matches in relation to teams unable to play cup games due to Coronavirus infections.

Northern

Southern

Second round
The draw for the Second round took place on 21 July 2021. All ties were played 6 and 7 August. The tie between Llandudno and Connah's Quay Nomads was reversed with Connah's Quay Nomads hosting the game instead of Llandudno.

Northern

Southern

Third round
The draw for the Third round took place on 11 August 2021. All ties were played 21 and 22 September.

Northern

Southern

Quarter-finals
The draw was made on 23 September with this being the last round where clubs were placed in regional draws. All ties were played on 26 October.

Northern

Southern

Semi-finals
The semi finals saw both remaining North Walian and South Walian clubs drawn together.

Final

References

Welsh League Cup seasons
2021–22 in Welsh football
Wales